The 2019 FIBA 3x3 U18 Africa Cup is the inaugural edition of the FIBA 3x3 U18 Africa Cup. It is the first-ever U18 national team competition for 3x3 in Africa. The game took place at the Lugogo Hockey Pitch in Kampala, Uganda on November 8-10. Eight men's and eight women's teams participated.

Format
Eight teams were divided into two pools of four teams, then top two teams from each pool advanced to the knockout stage.

Men's tournament

Pool stage

Pool A

Pool B

Knockout stage 
All times are local.

Final standings

Women's tournament

Pool stage

Pool A

Pool B

Knockout stage 
All times are local.

Final standings

Shoot-out contest

Format
One player from each men's and women's team participates. In the qualifier, each participant try ten shots from the top of the key (45 degrees angle with two racks) within 30 seconds. Top two men and two women players advance to the final. In the final stage, the four players try 18 shots within 60 seconds from four locations: five from the top of the arc, ten from the left and right wings (45 degrees), and three from the 3x3 logo which is counted as two points.

Awards
 Gold: Alou Traore (Mali's men)
 Silver: Claris Osula (Kenya's women) 
 Bronze: Mustapha Oyebanji (Nigeria's men)

References 

 Schedule and results
 Standings

External links
 Official website

2019 in 3x3 basketball
November 2019 sports events in Africa